The 1948 United States presidential election in North Dakota took place on November 2, 1948, as part of the 1948 United States presidential election. Voters chose four representatives, or electors, to the Electoral College, who voted for president and vice president.

North Dakota was won by Governor Thomas Dewey (R–New York), running with Governor Earl Warren, with 52.17% of the popular vote, against incumbent President Harry S. Truman (D–Missouri), running with Kentucky Senator Alben W. Barkley, with 43.41% of the popular vote.

Results

Results by county

See also
 United States presidential elections in North Dakota

References

North Dakota
1948
1948 North Dakota elections